Manjul Bhargava  (born 8 August 1974) is a Canadian-American mathematician. He is the Brandon Fradd, Class of 1983, Professor of Mathematics at Princeton University, the Stieltjes Professor of Number Theory at Leiden University, and also holds Adjunct Professorships at the Tata Institute of Fundamental Research, the Indian Institute of Technology Bombay, and the University of Hyderabad. He is known primarily for his contributions to number theory.

Bhargava was awarded the Fields Medal in 2014. According to the International Mathematical Union citation; he was awarded the prize "for developing powerful new methods in the geometry of numbers, which he applied to count rings of small rank and to bound the average rank of elliptic curves".

Education and career
Bhargava was born to an Indian family in Hamilton, Ontario, Canada, but grew up and attended school primarily in Long Island, New York. His mother Mira Bhargava, a mathematician at Hofstra University, was his first mathematics teacher. He completed all of his high school math and computer science courses by age 14. He attended Plainedge High School in North Massapequa, and graduated in 1992 as the class valedictorian. He obtained his AB from Harvard University in 1996. For his research as an undergraduate, he was awarded the 1996 Morgan Prize. Bhargava went on to pursue graduate studies at Princeton University, where he completed a doctoral dissertation titled "Higher composition laws" under the supervision of Andrew Wiles and received his PhD in 2001, with the support of a Hertz Fellowship. He was a visiting scholar at the Institute for Advanced Study in 2001–02, and at Harvard University in 2002–03. Princeton appointed him as a tenured Full Professor in 2003. He was appointed to the Stieltjes Chair in Leiden University in 2010.

Bhargava is also an accomplished tabla player, having studied under gurus such as Zakir Hussain. He also studied Sanskrit from his grandfather Purushottam Lal Bhargava, a well-known scholar of Sanskrit and ancient Indian history. He is an admirer of Sanskrit poetry.

Career and research
Bhargava’s PhD thesis generalized Gauss's classical law for composition of binary quadratic forms to many other situations. One major use of his results is the parametrization of quartic and quintic orders in number fields, thus allowing the study of asymptotic behavior of arithmetic properties of these orders and fields.

His research also includes fundamental contributions to the representation theory of quadratic forms, to interpolation problems and p-adic analysis, to the study of ideal class groups of algebraic number fields, and to the arithmetic theory of elliptic curves. A short list of his specific mathematical contributions are:

Fourteen new Gauss-style composition laws.
Determination of the asymptotic density of discriminants of quartic and quintic number fields.
Proofs of the first-known cases of the Cohen-Lenstra-Martinet heuristics for class groups.
Proof of the 15 theorem, including an extension of the theorem to other number sets such as the odd numbers and the prime numbers.
Proof (with Jonathan Hanke) of the 290 theorem.
A novel generalization of the factorial function, Bhargava factorial, providing an answer to a decades-old question of George Pólya.
Proof (with Arul Shankar) that the average rank of all elliptic curves over Q (when ordered by height) is bounded.
Proof that most hyperelliptic curves over Q have no rational points.

In 2015, Manjul Bhargava and Arul Shankar proved the Birch and Swinnerton-Dyer conjecture for a positive proportion of elliptic curves.

Awards and honours

Bhargava has won several awards for his research, the most prestigious being the Fields Medal, the highest award in the field of mathematics, which he won in 2014.

Bhargava was conferred a Fellowship at the Royal Society in 2019.

Bhargava is the third-youngest full professor in Princeton University's history, after Charles Fefferman and John Pardon.

In addition, he won the Morgan Prize and Hertz Fellowship in 1996, a Clay 5-year Research Fellowship, the Merten M. Hasse Prize from the MAA in 2003, the Clay Research Award in 2005, and the Leonard M. and Eleanor B. Blumenthal Award for the Advancement of Research in Pure Mathematics in 2005.

Peter Sarnak of Princeton University has said of Bhargava:

He was named one of Popular Science magazine's "Brilliant 10" in November 2002. He won the $10,000 SASTRA Ramanujan Prize, shared with Kannan Soundararajan, awarded by SASTRA in 2005 at Thanjavur, India, for his outstanding contributions to number theory.

In 2008, Bhargava was awarded the American Mathematical Society's Cole Prize. The citation reads:

In 2009, he was awarded the Face of the Future award at the India Abroad Person of the Year ceremony in New York City. In 2014, the same publication, the most prestigious and most widely read of the diaspora publications, gave him a second prize, India Abroad Publisher's Prize for Special Excellence.

In 2011, he was awarded the Fermat Prize for "various generalizations of the Davenport-Heilbronn estimates and for his startling recent results (with Arul Shankar) on the average rank of elliptic curves".

In 2011, he delivered the Hedrick lectures of the MAA in Lexington, Kentucky. He was also the 2011 Simons Lecturer at MIT.

In 2012, Bhargava was named an inaugural recipient of the Simons Investigator Award, and became a fellow of the American Mathematical Society in its inaugural class of fellows.

He was awarded the 2012 Infosys Prize in mathematics for his "extraordinarily original work in algebraic number theory, which has revolutionized the way in which number fields and elliptic curves are counted".

In 2013, he was elected to the National Academy of Sciences.

In 2014, Bhargava was awarded the Fields Medal at the International Congress of Mathematicians in Seoul for "developing powerful new methods in the geometry of numbers, which he applied to count rings of small rank and to bound the average rank of elliptic curves".

In 2015, he was awarded the Padma Bhushan, the third-highest civilian award of India.

In 2017, Bhargava was elected as a member of the American Academy of Arts and Sciences.

In 2018 Bhargava was named as the inaugural occupant of The Distinguished Chair for the Public Dissemination of Mathematics at The National Museum of Mathematics (MoMath). This is the first visiting professorship in the United States dedicated exclusively to raising public awareness of mathematics.

Selected publications

See also
 Indians in the New York City metropolitan area

References

External links
Manjul Bhargava at NPR
Manjul Bhargava at ICTS
Article in The Hindu on Bhargava winning the SASTRA prize
Princeton University article by Steven Schultz

1974 births
Living people
21st-century Indian mathematicians
Canadian mathematicians
Canadian people of Indian descent
Clay Research Award recipients
Fellows of the American Mathematical Society
Members of the United States National Academy of Sciences
Foreign Fellows of the Indian National Science Academy
Indian number theorists
Fields Medalists
Harvard University alumni
Institute for Advanced Study visiting scholars
Academic staff of Leiden University
Princeton University alumni
Princeton University faculty
Recipients of the SASTRA Ramanujan Prize
People from Hamilton, Ontario
People from North Massapequa, New York
American academics of Indian descent
Recipients of the Padma Bhushan in science & engineering
Simons Investigator
Canadian Fellows of the Royal Society